Ederson Fofonka (born 12 March 1974 in Porto Alegre, Brazil) is a retired football forward.

During his club career, Ederson played for Defensor Sporting, Iraklis, UAG Tecos, Kerkyra and Panserraikos.

External links
 
 

1974 births
Living people
Brazilian footballers
Footballers from Porto Alegre
Association football forwards
Defensor Sporting players
FC Nantes players
Iraklis Thessaloniki F.C. players
A.O. Kerkyra players
Panserraikos F.C. players
Tecos F.C. footballers
Super League Greece players
Brazilian expatriate footballers
Brazilian expatriate sportspeople in Uruguay
Brazilian expatriate sportspeople in Mexico
Brazilian expatriate sportspeople in Greece
Expatriate footballers in Uruguay
Expatriate footballers in Mexico
Expatriate footballers in Greece